Prosper Jan Bruggeman (14 March 1870 – 6 March 1939) was a Belgian rower who competed in the 1900 Summer Olympics. He was part of the Belgian boat Royal Club Nautique de Gand, which won the silver medal in the men's eight.

References

External links
 

1870 births
1939 deaths
Belgian male rowers
Olympic rowers of Belgium
Rowers at the 1900 Summer Olympics
Olympic silver medalists for Belgium
Flemish sportspeople
Olympic medalists in rowing
Medalists at the 1900 Summer Olympics
European Rowing Championships medalists
Rowers from Ghent